The relaxed intersection of m sets corresponds to the classical
intersection between sets except that it is allowed to relax few sets in order to avoid an empty intersection.
This notion can be used to solve Constraints Satisfaction Problems
that are inconsistent by relaxing a small number of constraints.
When a bounded-error approach is considered for parameter estimation,
the relaxed intersection makes it possible to be robust with respect
to some outliers.

Definition

The q-relaxed intersection of the m subsets

denoted by

is the set of all

which belong to all

's, except

at most.
This definition is illustrated by Figure 1.

Define

We have

Characterizing the q-relaxed intersection is a thus a set inversion problem.

Example

Consider 8 intervals:

We have

Relaxed intersection of intervals

The relaxed intersection of intervals is not necessary an interval. We thus take
the interval hull of the result. If 's are intervals, the relaxed
intersection can be computed with a complexity of m.log(m) by using the 
Marzullo's algorithm. It suffices to
sort all lower and upper bounds of the m intervals to represent the
function . Then, we easily get the set

which corresponds to a union of intervals.
We then return the
smallest interval which contains this union.

Figure 2 shows the function

associated to the previous example.

Relaxed intersection of boxes

To compute the q-relaxed intersection of m boxes of
, we project all m boxes with respect to the n axes.
For each of the n groups of m intervals, we compute the q-relaxed intersection.
We return Cartesian product of the n resulting intervals.

Figure 3 provides an
illustration of the 4-relaxed intersection of 6 boxes. Each point of the
red box belongs to 4 of the 6 boxes.

Relaxed union

Note that when q=0, the relaxed union/intersection corresponds to
the classical union/intersection. More precisely, we have

and

De Morgan's law

As a consequence

Relaxation of contractors

Let  be m contractors for the sets ,
then

is a contractor for 
and

are contractors for

Combined with a branch-and-bound algorithm such as SIVIA (Set Inversion Via Interval Analysis), the q-relaxed
intersection of m subsets of  can be computed.

Application to bounded-error estimation

The q-relaxed intersection can be used for robust localization

or for tracking.

Robust observers can also be implemented using the relaxed intersections to be robust with respect to outliers.

We propose here a simple example

to illustrate the method.
Consider a model the ith model output of which is given by

where .  Assume that we have

The sets  for different  are depicted on
Figure 4.

References

Satisfiability problems
Estimation theory